Ek Mahal Ho Sapno Ka is a 1975 Indian Hindi-language drama film directed by Devendra Goel. It stars Ashok Kumar, Dharmendra, Sharmila Tagore, Leena Chandavarkar, Deven Verma. The music was composed by Ravi.

Cast
Ashok Kumar as Anand Kumar
Dharmendra as Vishal
Sharmila Tagore as Aruna 
Leena Chandavarkar as Sonia
Deven Verma as Ramu Makhichandani "Shola"
David as Dr. Abraham 
Ramesh Deo as Dr. Mathur
Achala Sachdev as Vishal's Mother
Mohan Sherry as Prakash 
Jagdish Raj as Paul

Plot
Vishal met Aruna and they both fall in love. However, soon Aruna finds from Dr. Mathur that she will be blind within 6 months as she suffers from optic atrophy. Devastated, Aruna decides to leave Vishal as she doesn't wish to burden him, who is already taking care of his disabled mother. With no other choice left, she decides to marry Anand Kumar, her much older employer. Anand is reluctant and doesn't want to ruin her life and tries to talk her out of it. Helpless, Aruna marries him. Vishal is devastated and is confused of why did she marry him and thinks she betrayed him. Things, take a turn when Anand's young daughter Sonia falls for Vishal. Vishal dislikes her but later falls for her too.

Soon, after 6 months, Aruna realises that the day has come, terrified, she faints. She is taken to Dr Mathur, who is shocked to see her report. It is later revealed that due to a medical strike, Aruna's report was wrong and her eyesight is fine. Aruna learns that Sonia is in love with Vishal and decides to sacrifice her love as she cared for Sonia deeply. She meets Vishal and asks him to forget her. Sonia who overheard them talking is shocked, realising her mistake, she tries to convince Aruna to marry him, but in vain. Unfortunately, Anand dies in an accident and Aruna is severely injured. She decides to feign blindness so that Sonia can marry Vishal.

One day, Sonia discovers that Aruna sacrificed for her all these time. She goes to tell Vishal about it, even though Aruna tries to stop her. Vishal learning of this is guilty for misunderstanding Aruna. They get a letter from Aruna asking him to marry Sonia. She mentions that she is going away and he must never find her. Aruna is kidnapped by Prakash who lusts for Aruna. Vishal and Sonia fight the goons and save Aruna. In the end, Aruna and Vishal are married.

Songs
The music of the film was given by Ravi and lyrics by Sahir Ludhianvi.

References

External links
 

Films scored by Ravi
1975 films
1970s Hindi-language films
Films directed by Devendra Goel